Willand Rovers Football Club is a football club based in Willand, near Exeter, in Devon. The club is affiliated to the Devon County Football Association.

History

Willand Rovers Football Club was formed in 1946, after the financial collapse of Willand Wanderers FC, (formed in 1907), during the Second World War. The club moved to their present home of Silver Street in the 1950s and were playing in the Devon and Exeter Football League. The club in 1990 was relegated to the Senior Division of the Devon and Exeter Football League as their ground was not considered up to the standard of the premier division. However, the club went back to the premier division for the 1991–92 season.

For the start of the 1992–93 season they were among the founder members of the Devon League. They went on to win the winning that league twice before gaining promotion to the Western League Division One in 2001. They won the Western League Division One title in 2004–05, earning another promotion to the Western League Premier Division where they have finished in the top six during each of their seasons at that level. Willand Rovers made it to the Les Phillips Cup Final in 2006, losing to Corsham Town, but went one better in 2007, winning the Cup after a final against Welton Rovers. They reached the Fifth Round of the FA Vase in 2009–10.

Ground

Willand Rovers play their home games at Silver Street, Willand, Cullompton, EX15 2RG.

Honours

League honours
Western Football League Premier Division
Runners-up (1): 2009–10
Western Football League Division One
Champions (1): 2004–05
Devon County League
Champions (2): 1998–99, 2000–01

Cup honours
Devon St Lukes Bowl:
 Runners-up (1): 2007–08
Les Phillips Cup:
 Winners (3): 2006–07, 2012–13, 2014–15
 Runners-up (1): 2005–06

Records
Highest League Position: 1st Champions in Western Football League Premier Division 2018/19
FA Cup best performance: Fourth Qualifying Round 2014–15
FA Vase best performance: Quarter final 2018-19

Former players

References

External links
Official club website

Football clubs in Devon
Western Football League
1946 establishments in England
Association football clubs established in 1946
Mid Devon District
Football clubs in England
Devon County League